Kuldan also known as Kuldān, is a village located in the Gwadar district of Balochistan, Pakistan. 
 
Kuldan is located at  25° 20' 30" N, 61° 46' 30" E on the Makran Coastal Highway where it crosses the Dasht River
Kuldan is a small village with a population of approximately 1000 people, and two mosques. 
The village is 15 kilometers east of the border with Iran and is  the last Pakistani town before the crossing.

References

Villages in Pakistan
Gwadar District